The BBC Radio 4 programme Desert Island Discs invites castaways to choose eight pieces of music, a book (in addition to the Bible – or a religious text appropriate to that person's beliefs – and the Complete Works of Shakespeare) and a luxury item that they would take to an imaginary desert island, where they will be marooned indefinitely.

The rules state that the chosen luxury item must not be anything animate or indeed anything that enables the castaway to escape from the island, for instance a radio set, sailing yacht or aeroplane. The choices of book and luxury can sometimes give insight into the guest's life, and the choices of guests from 2011 to 2020.

Desert Island Discs takes two short breaks, in (the northern) spring and summer. BBC Radio 4 broadcasts new programmes for approximately 42 weeks each year on Sunday mornings, usually with a repeat transmission 5 days later. On Remembrance Sunday (in November) the programme is not broadcast but that week's programme gets a single airing in the Friday repeat slot.

2011

2012

2013

2014

2015

2016

2017

2018

2019

2020

Notes
  Instead of the Bible: The Koran
  No Bible
  Instead of the Bible: The Torah

References

External links
Desert Island Discs at BBC Radio 4

Episodes 2011-2020
Lists of British radio series episodes
2010s in the United Kingdom
2010s in British music
2020s in the United Kingdom
2020s in British music